Cianjur is a town and district in the West Java province of Indonesia, and is the seat of Cianjur Regency. The district of Cianjur is located along one of the main roads between Jakarta (120 km to the northwest) and Bandung (60 km to the east). The population was 158,125 at the 2010 Census and 173,265 at the 2020 Census; the official estimate as at mid 2021 was 174,587. Because of its location, some of Cianjur's residents commute to work either in Bandung or in Jakarta.

The road on which Cianjur is located used to be the main (extremely busy) road from Jakarta to Bandung but was in effect replaced as the main road link between these two main cities when the Jakarta-Bandung tollroad was fully completed in 2005. However, due to its low traffic, Cianjur returned as one of the alternative routes for travellers from Jakarta and Bandung.

History

Cianjur was founded in 1677, with the first head of the town being R. A. Wiratanudatar I, entitled Dalem Cikundul, as the descendant from the old Sundanese city of Pajajaran.

By 2007 the city government asked female municipal employees to wear jilbab (hijab). It also placed road signs encouraging women to wear jilbab.

A magnitude 7.0 earthquake struck offshore West Java on September 2, 2009, killing 21 people in Cianjur alone.

Another 5.6 magnitude earthquake occurred on November 21, 2022, killing 331 and injuring 7,729 others.

Administrative divisions
Cianjur district is divided into 11 administrative villages which are as follows:

Babakankaret
Bojongherang
Limbangansari
Mekarsari
Muka
Nagrak
Pamoyanan
Sawahgede
Sayang
Solokpandan
Sukamaju

Economy
The district mainly produces home and micro Industrial products, especially leather, wood, precious metals, woven, pottery, fabrics, and foods.

Transportation
After being dormant for about 2 years, the train called Siliwangi between Sukabumi and Cianjur was reactivated on 8 February 2014. It is faster than the buses which are usually trapped in traffic jams, but the cost of a train ticket is double that of using buses.

Climate
Cianjur has a tropical rainforest climate (Af) with moderate rainfall from June to September and heavy rainfall from October to May.

Notable residents
 Djumhana Wiriaatmadja (1904–1975) politician and diplomat
 Mohammad Enoch (1893–1965) engineer and politician
 Robi Darwis (b. 2003) footballer
 Rd Mochtar (b. 1918) actor
 Nyonya The Tiang Ek, 1920s–30s writer and translator
 Utuy Tatang Sontani (1920–1979) writer and university lecturer

References 

1677 establishments in Asia
Cianjur Regency
Populated places in West Java
Regency seats of West Java

map-bms:Kabupaten Cianjur
jv:Kabupatèn Cianjur
nl:Cianjur (regentschap)
su:Kabupatén Cianjur